The St. John's University strike of 1966–1967 was a strike by faculty at St. John's University in New York City which began on January 4, 1966, and ended in June 1967. The strike began after 31 faculty members were dismissed in the fall of 1965 without due process, dismissals which some felt were a violation of the professors' academic freedom. The strike ended without any re-instatements, but led to the widespread unionization of public college faculty in the New York City area.

Cause of the strike
Low faculty salaries, the lack of a pension plan and insurance, and lack of faculty participation in University governance had led to conflicts with the Very Rev. Edward J. Burke, President of St. John's, during 1965, including a walk-out of about two hundred professors from a general faculty meeting on March 6, 1965. The continuing unrest led to Father Burke's removal as President by the Board of Trustees - he was replaced by the Very Rev. Joseph T. Cahill on July 15, 1965.

In the fall of 1965, 31 faculty members at St. John's University were dismissed without due process or any hearing. Both the American Association of University Professors (AAUP) and the United Federation of College Teachers (UFCT) claimed the university had violated the professors' academic freedom. St. John's, the two groups said, demanded that the faculty restrict their teaching to a narrow, dogmatic approach to Thomism and required faculty to submit all articles and books to the administration for clearance before seeking publication. Father Cahill, president of St. John's, said the teachers had used their classrooms for propaganda purposes.

The president of the UFCT, Israel Kugler, pushed for a more radical response to the dispute. The AAUP refused to engage in a strike, and largely withdrew from the dispute when faculty appeared to support Kugler. Kugler called for a strike to begin in January 1966, and widened the dispute to include pay and benefits (faculty pay was the lowest of the 10 largest Catholic universities in the U.S. A National Citizens Committee for the Defense of Academic Freedom at St. John's University sponsored a rally at the Manhattan Center, attended by over 2,000 people. The committee was co-chaired by historian Richard Hofstadter of Columbia University) and John Leo, associate editor of Commonweal.

The strike begins
The strike at St. John's started on January 4, 1966. The union pushed for mediation and arbitration in December 1965, but the university refused to submit to either. Using tactics pioneered by Albert Shanker to win collective bargaining rights for New York City public school teachers, Kugler pushed for local and state government officials to get involved in the dispute. Only a minority of St. John's faculty walked out, forcing the university to close some but not a majority of classes.

During the next two years, Kugler challenged the university's accreditation before the Middle States Association of Colleges and Schools twice. But that body only warned the university and took no further action. The National Citizens Committee for the Defense of Academic Freedom at St. John's University placed several large advertisements in the New York Times, seeking to keep the strike on readers' minds and embarrass the University at the same time.

The union raised $250,000 from the Workmen's Circle and other organizations to support the striking faculty. Kugler took professors' case to the Vatican and sought an individual audience with Pope Paul VI, whose encyclicals on workers' rights were repeatedly cited by the union. But the pope refused him an audience.

Other tactics were tried as well. Some faculty sued the university for fraud for including their names in the 1966 catalog of classes. Pickets went up at the spring 1966 commencement and the fall 1966 opening convocation.

The strike ends
In the early spring of 1967, as the strike threatened to widen to other Catholic universities in the country and state legislators opened hearings on the labor dispute, the university agreed to arbitration.

The strike ended in June 1967. The union did not win recognition at St. John's, and in 1970 arbitrators ruled that the university had not acted improperly.

Assessment and outcomes
Although the strike was a failure in that it did not win reinstatement for the faculty, the strike established the American Federation of Teachers (AFT) as the pre-eminent union organizing American higher education faculty. Kugler quickly turned the UFCT's attention to other colleges and universities in the New York City area. In the next few years, under his leadership the union organized locals at the Fashion Institute of Technology (FIT), Nassau Community College and Westchester Community College. In 1967, Kugler began pushing for the UFCT to organize the faculty at CUNY. Backed by the AFT and the newly formed (and politically powerful) United Federation of Teachers, UFCT not only won an agreement for a union election but won the December 6, 1968, election in the face of a determined challenge from the AAUP. The union won a second election (this time for non-tenured faculty) nine days later, and a signed contract nine months later.

In 1972, Kugler merged the UFCT with its long-time rival, the Legislative Conference of the City University. The two groups formed a new organization affiliated with the AFT, the Professional Staff Congress (PSC). As of 2007, the PSC represented more than 20,000 faculty and staff members at CUNY.

Kugler later wrote a well-regarded article about the strike, "The 1966 Strike at St. John's University: A Memoir," which was published in Labor's Heritage in 1997.

Notes

References
Clarity, James F. "Union Wins Vote of C.U. Faculty." New York Times. December 7, 1968.
Currivan, Gene. "$100,000 Sought in St. John's Case." New York Times. October 12, 1969.
Currivan, Gene. "St. John's Bars Mediation By City." New York Times. December 28, 1965.
Currivan, Gene. "St. John's Gets Mediation Offer." New York Times. December 24, 1965.
Currivan, Gene. "St. John's Hints Faculty Conduct Led to Ousters." New York Times. December 23, 1965.
Currivan, Gene. "St. John's Opens Despite Its Strike." New York Times. January 5, 1966.
Currivan, Gene. "St. John's Reopening Today With Faculty Strikers Resuming Picket Line." New York Times. September 19, 1966.
Currivan, Gene. "St. John's Retains Its Accreditation." New York Times. May 4, 1968.
Currivan, Gene. "St. John's Strike on Jan. 3 Called By Teacher Union." New York Times. December 18, 1965.
Currivan, Gene. "St. John's Warned Its Accreditation May Be Revoked." New York Times. December 2, 1966.
Currivan, Gene. "St. John's Warns 25 Absentees to Return to Job or Face Action." New York Times. January 6, 1966.
Dallos, Robert E. "St. John's Calls Boycott Failure." New York Times. January 11, 1966.
Dallos, Robert E. "St. John's to Keep Its Accreditation But Gets Warning." New York Times. May 1, 1966.
Dallos, Robert E. "Teachers Protest at St. John's Commencement." New York Times. June 13, 1966.
Farber, M.A. "City U. Election On Union Stalled." New York Times. May 12, 1968.
"Featherman File." The Forward. March 27, 1998.
Gansberg, Martin. "St. John's Dispute to Be Arbitrated." New York Times. June 20, 1967.
Gansberg, Martin. "St. John's Strike Closes Classes, But 2 Sides Disagree on Number." New York Times. February 15, 1966.
Grutzner, Charles. "Mayor Offers Aid on St. Johns." New York Times. January 4, 1966.
Handler, M.S. "City U. and Untenured Teachers Reach Agreement on a Contract." New York Times. September 11, 1969.
Harte, Alex. "St. John's U Teachers Fight for Free Speech." The Militant, January 10, 1966, 8.
Hechinger, Fred M. "City U. Faculty to Cast 2d Vote On Union to Represent 4,500." New York Times. December 16, 1968.
Hevesi, Dennis. "Israel Kugler, Union Official Who Led Strike at St. John’s, Dies at 90." New York Times. October 8, 2007.
Johnston, Richard J.H. "Legislative Panel Will Investigate Sale by L.I.U. and Dismissals at St. John's." New York Times. October 10, 1967.
Kaplan, Morris. "Faculty Strikers Suing St. John's." New York Times. June 2, 1966.
Kugler, Israel. "The 1966 Strike at St. John's University: A Memoir." Labor's Heritage. 9:2 (Fall 1997): 4-19.
Malcolm, Andrew H. "Arbitrators Absolve St. John's of Teachers' Antiunion Charge." New York Times. January 28, 1970.
Morris, John D. "Catholic U. Classes Stopped as Protest Spreads in Faculty." New York Times. April 21, 1967.
"New Impasse Stalls Plans to Arbitrate St. John's Dispute." New York Times. April 6, 1967.
Polishook, Sheila Stern. "Collective Bargaining and the City University of New York." Journal of Higher Education. 41:5 (May 1970).
Scimecca, Joseph, and Roland Damiano. Crisis at St. John's: Strike and Revolution on the Catholic Campus (Random House, 1967).
"Strife at St. John's." Time. December 31, 1965.

External links
American Federation of Teachers: Office of the President, 1960-1974. American Federation of Teachers Collection. Archives of Labor and Urban Affairs. Walter P. Reuther Library, Wayne State University.
Guide to the Professional Staff Congress/City University of New York 1936-2004. Tamiment Library/Robert F. Wagner Labor Archives. Bobst Library, New York University.
Vaughan, Roger. "Priest vs. Priest as a Strike Disrupts a University," LIFE, January 21, 1966.

1966 labor disputes and strikes
1967 labor disputes and strikes
American Federation of Teachers
St. John's University (New York City)
Education labor disputes in the United States
1966 in New York City
1967 in New York City
Labor disputes in New York City